Leslie Allen Carlyon  (10 June 1942 – 4 March 2019) was an Australian writer and newspaper editor.

Early life 

Carlyon began his career in journalism with The Herald and Weekly Times as a cadet on the Sun News-Pictorial (now the Herald Sun) in 1960. In 1963, he moved to The Age working successively as leader writer, finance editor, news editor, assistant editor and, in 1975 aged 33, editor, following the sudden death of the previous editor, Graham Perkin. Carlyon had to resign for health reasons in 1976 after just one year in the position.

From 1977 to 1982, he was a visiting lecturer in journalism at RMIT University, Melbourne. During this time, he continued writing for newspapers across Australia with a particular focus on horse racing.

In 1984, Carlyon returned to an executive role in journalism with his first employer, the Herald and Weekly Times, where he was promoted to editor-in-chief.  After resigning in 1986, Carlyon again continued as a freelance writer and columnist during the 1990s, contributing to such publications as the Sydney Morning Herald, Western Australia's The Sunday Times and The Bulletin.

Carlyon twice won the Walkley Award for journalism (1971 and 2004). In 1993, he won the Graham Perkin Australian Journalist of the Year Award.

Books 
In addition to his career as a journalist, Carlyon was also an accomplished author writing mainly on sport and Australian military history. His books include:

 
 
 
 
 

Gallipoli, a popular history of the Allied Gallipoli campaign in the Dardanelles during the First World War (which remains a key event in the Australian and New Zealand national consciousnesses), was published in 2001, and met with critical and commercial success in Australia, New Zealand and England. The book was the basis for the Australian 2015 TV miniseries Gallipoli, released in the year of the 100th anniversary of the campaign.

The Great War is the story of Australian forces on the Western Front in France and Belgium also during World War I.

Les Carlyon: A Life in Words, published posthumously, is a collection of Carlyon's articles from across his career, selected by his family and with a foreword by his son, Patrick Carlyon.

Awards 
In the 2014 Queen's Birthday Honours List, Carlyon was invested as a Companion of the Order of Australia (AC), for "eminent service to literature through the promotion of the national identity as an author, editor and journalist, to the understanding and appreciation of Australia's war history, and to the horseracing industry".

He was admitted to the Australian Media Hall of Fame.

He served as a Member of the Council of the Australian War Memorial from May 2006 until his death (he was replaced by Tony Abbott). In April 2020, the Australian War Memorial announced the inaugural Les Carlyon Literary Prize in his memory.

Awards 
Walkley Award for magazine feature writing 1971
Graham Perkin Australian Journalist of the Year Award 1993
Walkley Award for journalism leadership 2004
Melbourne Press Club Quill Award for Lifetime Achievement 2004
Prime Minister's Prize for History 2007 (for The Great War)
Companion of the Order of Australia (AC) 2014

Death 
Carlyon's death, aged 76, on 4 March 2019 was widely reported.

References

External links

‘Gallipoli in a Nation’s Remembrance’; Australian War Memorial Anniversary Oration by Les Carlyon; 11 November 2004 (transcript and audio)
Les Carlyon 'The Write Stuff' The Age 21 March 2005
Transcript of interview, 30 June 2006 by Andrew Denton on ABC television program Enough Rope
Transcript of interview by Tony Jones 25 May 2007 on ABC television program Lateline
Les Carlyon and Barrie Cassidy in Conversation: Writer Les Carlyon and sports journalist Barrie Cassidy talk about the interplay between sport and war. This discussion, held at the State Library of Victoria on 19 August 2008, was part of the program of events for the Sport and War exhibition

1942 births
2019 deaths
Australian editors
Australian historians
Australian military historians
Australian people of Cornish descent
Companions of the Order of Australia
Academic staff of RMIT University
University of Melbourne alumni
Walkley Award winners
Historians of World War I